Daung Yin Pyan Bon Nabay Mhar Sar Yay Loh Htar Chin Dal is a 2022 Burmese drama television series directed by Zabyu Htun Thet Lwin starring Kyaw Htet Zaw, Nan Sandar Hla Htun, Su Htet Hlaing, Thar Htet Nyan Zaw, Nay Yee Win Lai, Nan Shwe Yee and Sett Yoon Twel Tar. It is an adaptation of the popular novel "Daung Yin Pyan Bon Nabay Mhar Sar Yay Loh Htar Chin Dal" by Nwam Jar Thaing. It aired on MRTV-4, from June 2 to July 21, 2022, on Mondays to Fridays at 19:00 for 36 episodes.

Synopsis
Thet Thet denied all the boys who were interested in her. Her refusal included Zaw Myo Khant, who was always by her side. Zaw Myo Khant was obsessed with her and started drinking. Thet Thet did not care for him at all. Zaw Myo Khan always yells at Thel Phyu, who suffers from asthma. But Thel Phyu loves him and is humble. When Thet Thet met Naing Lin, who had a wife, she was pleased with his words. Thet Thet was sincerely friendly with Naing Lin, but she became reluctant as the environment falsely accused her. When Naing Lin's wife asked her to back off, she became even angrier and more reluctant. Naing Lin's wife, headmistress Daw Tin May Oo was very angry and she slapped Thet Thet on the cheek.Thet Thet was even angrier and she did not back down at all, but moved on. And she married Naing Lin. But Daw Tin May Oo did not divorce Naing Lin. Later she calmed down and lived in the same house with Naing Lin and Thet Thet. However, Naing Lin also had an affair with singer Mya Moe Thu. Thet Thet knew about it and killed both Naing Lin and Mya Moe Thu. Finally, Thet Thet repented and wrote a note.

Cast
Kyaw Htet Zaw as Naing Lin
Nan Sandar Hla Htun as Thet Thet
Su Htet Hlaing as Daw Tin May Oo
Thar Htet Nyan Zaw as Zaw Myo Khant
Nay Yee Win Lai as Thel Phyu
Sett Yoon Twel Tar as Mya Moe Thu
Phyo Eaindra Min as Nyein Hla
Nan Shwe Yee as Khin Myint Swe
Hnin Oo Wai as Thida Soe
Min Thu as Kyi Maung
Wah Wah Aung as Ma Theint
Ei Si Kway as Kyaw Kyaw
Sara Song Oo as Ma Mi

References

Burmese television series
MRTV (TV network) original programming